Feihe Township is a township in Huaiyuan County, Anhui, China. , it administers the following 21 villages:
Xinji Village
Malu Village
Zhonghuang Village
Zhongfei Village
Hongxing Village
Qianhe Village
Sanguan Village
Shaolou Village
Renhe Village
Miaodong Village
Taiping Village
Chenzhuang Village
Nanhai Village
Lingji Village
Hezui Village
Liuqiao Village
Kantuan Village
Sihu Village
Jiwei Village
Tenghu Village
Huwei Village

References 

Township-level divisions of Anhui
Huaiyuan County